Hitting the Trail is a 1918 American silent crime drama film directed by Dell Henderson and starring Carlyle Blackwell, Evelyn Greeley and George MacQuarrie.

Cast
 Carlyle Blackwell as Kid Kelly 
 Evelyn Greeley as 	Flo Haines
 Joseph W. Smiley as 	Joe Carelli 
 George MacQuarrie as 	Reverend Thomas Roberts
 Ninon Bunyea as 	Mamie 
 Muriel Ostriche as 	Annie
 Walter Greene as 	Tony
 Edward Elkas as Goldberg

References

Bibliography
 Connelly, Robert B. The Silents: Silent Feature Films, 1910-36, Volume 40, Issue 2. December Press, 1998.
 Munden, Kenneth White. The American Film Institute Catalog of Motion Pictures Produced in the United States, Part 1. University of California Press, 1997.

External links
 

1918 films
1918 drama films
1910s English-language films
American silent feature films
American black-and-white films
Films directed by Dell Henderson
World Film Company films
1910s American films
Silent American drama films